The 2014 Savannah State Tigers football team represented Savannah State University in the 2014 NCAA Division I FCS football season. The Tigers were members of the Mid-Eastern Athletic Conference (MEAC). This was their second season under the guidance of head coach Earnest Wilson and the Tigers played their home games at Ted Wright Stadium. They finished the season 0–12, 0–8 in MEAC play to finish in last place.

Schedule

References

Savannah State
Savannah State Tigers football seasons
College football winless seasons
Savannah State Tigers football